Peck House is a historic Greek Revival-style home located at Chatham in Columbia County, New York.  It was reconstructed about 1848 and is an imposing, 2-story, symmetrical, five-bay-wide and one-bay-deep dwelling with a substantial -story rear wing.  It features a three-bay, 1-story porch with Doric order columns.  The interior features a number of Greek Revival–style details.  Also on the property is a brick smoke house.

It was added to the National Register of Historic Places in 1973.  It is also included as a contributing building in the North Chatham Historic District, which was added to the National Register in 2012.

References

Houses on the National Register of Historic Places in New York (state)
Houses completed in 1848
Houses in Columbia County, New York
Greek Revival houses in New York (state)
National Register of Historic Places in Columbia County, New York
Historic district contributing properties in New York (state)